The Hare's Ear or  Gold Ribbed Hare’s Ear  is a traditional artificial fly imitating an aquatic insect larva (nymph) used in fly fishing.

Description
The Hare's Ear nymph fly is fished below the surface thus a wet fly or nymph. It is an older pattern that imitates a variety of aquatic life, including scuds, sow bugs, mayfly nymphs, and caddis larvae.

Tying
Soft hair and stiff bristles from a hare are wound around the shank of the hook and fastened with gold wire that suggests segmentation. Sometimes a gold bead head is added for weight and stability in the water and a strand of pheasant feather is added for a tail. The bead head can be fastened near the eye of the hook. This pattern is commonly tied on size 10 - 16 nymph hooks. Traditional colouring is a brown body with orange or brown thread.

Tactics
When this fly is immersed, the stiff fibers in the dubbing stand out and imitate the legs of an insect. Fish this lure below the surface with or without a small strike indicator and split-shot to help it sink. It is an effective pattern throughout the year because it covers a broad spectrum of prey that are active in every season.

References

External links
 Heptageniidae Mayfly Pictures and Behavior – Details about the mayfly family usually imitated by the Hare's Ear nymph.

Nymph patterns